Absaraka is an unincorporated community in central Cass County, North Dakota, United States.  It lies northwest of the city of Fargo, the county seat of Cass County.  Its elevation is 1,070 feet (326 m), and it is located at  (46.9780313, -97.3945341).

References

Unincorporated communities in Cass County, North Dakota
Unincorporated communities in North Dakota